Hosmer's spiny-tailed skink or Hosmer's skink (Egernia hosmeri) is a species of large skink, a lizard in the family Scincidae. The species is a diurnal, rock-dwelling species native to Northern Australia.

Description
Hosmer's spiny-tailed skink is mostly reddish-brown on top, with both scattered darker and paler spots along the back, legs, and tail.   It has a darker brown head and neck, white abdomen, and a few dark brown blotches under the chin. The snout–vent length (SVL) is 180mm, with a round, tapering tail about 60% of the SVL. It is most closely related to Cunningham's spiny-tailed skink (Egernia cunninghami), however the tail of E. hosmeri is flattened and spinier than that of E. cunninghami.

Geographic range
Hosmer's spiny-tailed skin is found throughout dry, rocky regions of Queensland and the Northern Territory.

Reproduction
Like some other reptiles, it is viviparous, giving birth to an average of four live young at a time.

Diet
Hosmer's spiny-tailed skink is omnivorous, eating insects, leaves, shoots, and berries.

References 

Reptiles described in 1955

Skinks of Australia
Egernia
Reptiles of Queensland
Reptiles of the Northern Territory
Endemic fauna of Australia
Taxa named by James Roy Kinghorn